La Société zoologique de France,  founded in 1876 by Aimé Bouvier, is a scientific society devoted to Zoology.  It publishes a bulletin and organises the Prix Gadeau de Kerville de la Société zoologique de France.

List of presidents

 1876–1877: Jules Vian
 1878: Félix Pierre Jousseaume
 1879: Edmond Perrier
 1880: Jules Vian
 1881: Fernand Lataste
 1882: Eugène Simon
 1883: Jules Künckel d'Herculais
 1884: Maurice Chaper
 1885: Jean Pierre Mégnin
 1886: Paul Henri Fischer
 1887: Adrien Certes
 1888: Jules Jullien
 1889: Gustave Cotteau
 1890: Jules de Guerne
 1891: Louis-Joseph Alcide Railliet
 1892: Philippe Dautzenberg
 1893: Émile Oustalet
 1894: Lionel Faurot
 1895: Léon Vaillant
 1896: Louis Eugène Bouvier
 1897: Romain Moniez
 1898: Henri Filhol
 1899: Charles Janet
 1900: Yves Delage
 1901: Édouard Louis Trouessart
 1902: Arthur René Jean Baptiste Bavay
 1903: Jules Richard
 1904: Edgard Hérouard
 1905: Louis Joubin
 1906: François-Xavier Raspail
 1907: Georges Pruvot
 1908: Paul Marchal
 1909: Charles Alluaud
 1910: François-Henri Coutière
 1911: Jean Baptiste François René Koehler
 1912: Adrien Dollfus
 1913: Louis Roule
 1914: Raphaël Blanchard
 1915: Maurice Caullery
 1916: Adrien Lucet
 1917: Jacques Pellegrin
 1918: Édouard Chevreux
 1919: Armand Lucien Clément
 1920: Émile Topsent
 1921: Étienne Rabaud
 1922: Émile Brumpt
 1923: Paul Carié
 1924: Charles Pérez
 1925: Louis Boutan
 1926: Félix Mesnil
 1927: Raoul Anthony
 1928: Édouard Chatton
 1929: Jean-Louis Fage
 1930: Alphonse Malaquin
 1931: Lucien Chopard
 1932: François Picard
 1933: Armand Billard
 1934: Léonce Joleaud
 1935: René Legendre
 1936: Louis Mercier
 1937: Marie Phisalix
 1938: René Jeannel
 1939: Pierre-Paul Grassé
 1940: Robert-Philippe Dolfus
 1941: Emmanuel Fauré-Fremiet
 1942: Édouard Bourdelle
 1943: Jacques Millot
 1944: Marcel Prenant
 1945: Georges Lavier
 1946: Henri Piéron
 1947: Édouard Fischer-Piette
 1948: Albert Vandel
 1949: Léon Bertin
 1950: Paul Marais de Beauchamp
 1951: Marcel Aberloos
 1952: Lucien Berland
 1953: Georges Teissier
 1954: Raymond Hovasse
 1955: Paul Vayssière
 1956: Germaine Cousin
 1957: Paul Remy
 1958: Étienne Wolff
 1959: Maurice Fontaine
 1960: Marcel Avel
 1961: Pierre Drach
 1962: Paul Pesson
 1963: Odette Tuzet
 1964: Jean Dorst
 1965: Georges Busnel
 1966: François Rollier
 1967: Alain Chabaud
 1968: Max Vachon
 1969: Marc de Larambergue
 1970: Bertrand Possompès
 1971: Louis Gallien
 1972: Hubert Lutz
 1973: Émile Biliotti
 1974: Roger Husson
 1975: Albert Raynaud
 1976–1977: Charles Bocquet
 1978–1979: Maxime Lamotte
 1980–1982: Claude Lévi
 1983–1984: Jean-Jacques Legrand
 1985–1986: Pierre Lubet
 1987–1988: Hubert Saint Girons
 1989: André Beaumont
 1990–2008: 
 2009: Jean-Loup d'Hondt
 2010–2011: 
 2012: René Lafont
 2018: Philippe Lherminier

External links
 

Zoological societies
Scientific organizations established in 1876
1876 establishments in France
Scientific organizations based in France